Hjalmar Öhagen (born 17 May 1985) is a retired Swedish football player who played midfielder.

Career 

Öhagen started playing football in Järbo IF but at the age of 14 moved to the Division 2 club Sandvikens IF, where he played from 1999-2006. During 2006 he was on trial at Halmstads BK who decided to sign him for the 2007 season.

On 28 July 2008 Halmstads BK confirmed that he would be loaned out to Ängelholms FF for the rest of the season. Not being able to take a place in Halmstads BK, Hjalmar started looking for others club to play in. Ängelholm wished to keep him, but he wanted to keep playing in Allsvenskan. On 2 December Halmstads BK confirmed that he had signed a contract with Gefle IF.

Nearing the end of his contract with Gefle IF, Öhagen's old club Sandvikens IF was interested in bringing him back to the club. They brought him on 29 August 2012.

Öhagen retired in December 2017.

Honours

Individual
 Sweden
Sandvikens IF
 Best midfielder in Division 2: 2006

References

External links
HBK Profile 

1985 births
Living people
Swedish footballers
Association football midfielders
Allsvenskan players
Halmstads BK players
Gefle IF players